First Snow may refer to:

 First Snow (1958 film), a South Korean film directed by Kim Ki-young
 First Snow (2006 film), a German/American film starring Guy Pearce and Piper Perabo
 First Snow (2012 film), a Canadian film directed by Michaël Lalancette